"All Day and All of the Night" is a song by the English rock band the Kinks from 1964. Released as a single, it reached No. 2 in the UK on the Record Retailer chart and No. 7 on the US Billboard Hot 100 chart in 1965. The song was included on the Kinksize Hits EP in the UK and the Kinks' second American  album, Kinks-Size (1965).

Background
Like their previous hit "You Really Got Me", the song is based on a power chord riff. Both songs are similar in beat and structure, with similar background vocals, progressions, and guitar solos.

Dave Davies claimed that the song was where he "found his voice":

Billboard described the song as a "potent entry," stating that the "raw, gutsy delivery is maintained along with raunchy guitar sound." Cash Box described it as a "raunchy-rock'er that should flip the teeners," similar to "You Really Got Me."

"Hello, I Love You" controversies
Similarities between the song and the Doors' 1968 song, "Hello, I Love You" have been pointed out. Ray Davies said on the topic: "My publisher wanted to sue. I was unwilling to do that. I think they cut a deal somewhere, but I don't know the details." Dave Davies added: "That one is the most irritating of all of them... I did a show where I played All Day and All of the Night and stuck in a piece of Hello, I Love You. There was some response, there were a few smiles. But I've never understood why nobody's ever said anything about it. You can't say anything about the Doors. You're not allowed to."

In the liner notes to the Doors Box set, Robby Krieger has denied the allegations that the song's musical structure was stolen from Ray Davies. Instead, he said the song's vibe was taken from Cream's song "Sunshine of Your Love".  According to the Doors biography No One Here Gets Out Alive, courts in the UK determined in favour of Davies and any royalties for the song are paid to him.

Personnel 

According to band researcher Doug Hinman:

The Kinks
Ray Davies lead vocal, rhythm guitar
Dave Davies backing vocal, lead guitar
Pete Quaife backing vocal, bass

Additional musicians
Perry Ford piano
Bobby Graham drums
Johnny B. Great backing vocal

Charts and certifications

Weekly charts

Certifications

The Stranglers version
The Stranglers recorded a cover in 1987, reaching No. 7 in the UK Singles Chart.

References

Sources 

 
 

1964 songs
1964 singles
1988 singles
The Kinks songs
Songs involved in plagiarism controversies
Pye Records singles
Reprise Records singles
Song recordings produced by Shel Talmy
Songs written by Ray Davies
The Stranglers songs
British hard rock songs
British garage rock songs